Gol va Mol (also known as Gol Mol, Golmol, and Golomel) is a village in Olya Rural District, in the Central District of Ardestan County, Isfahan Province, Iran. At the 2006 census, its population was 34, in 13 families.

References 

Populated places in Ardestan County